Soul Man is the second album from The X Factor UK series 2 runner-up Andy Abraham. It was released 13 November 2006 and peaked in the UK Album Chart at number 19 with first week sales of 23,505.

Track listing
"Still"
"What Becomes of the Brokenhearted"
"Don't Leave Me This Way"
"Ain't No Sunshine"
"Just My Imagination"
"I Can't Help Myself (Sugar Pie Honeybunch)"
"Easy"
"Tracks of My Tears"
"This Ole Heart of Mine"
"Too Busy Thinking 'Bout My Baby"
"I'm Gonna Make You Love Me"
"Heaven Help Us All"
"December Brings Me Back to You" (featuring Michael Underwood) (bonus track)

Charts

Weekly charts

Year-end charts

References

Andy Abraham albums
2006 albums
Covers albums
Albums produced by Brian Rawling